The Korea Medal, sometimes referred to as the Queen's Korea Medal to distinguish it from the United Nations Service Medal, is a campaign medal created in 1951 to recognize troops from Australia, Canada, New Zealand, and the United Kingdom who had given either one day's service in an air sortie over Korea, or 28 days service offshore, during the Korean War. The medal was identical in all countries where it was awarded, except for Canada where it contained unique elements. An award distributed across the Commonwealth, the Korea Medal holds a different place in each country's order of precedence for honours.

History
The Korean War was the first event in which United Nations (UN) armed forces took on a combat role in suppressing aggression, involving the participation of 20 UN member states, as well as South Korea and Italy, in a multinational effort to stop the North Korean takeover of South Korea. The Korea Medal was created in 1951 to recognize specifically members of the armed forces from King George VI's various states at the time that participated in the Korean War; namely, Australia, Canada, New Zealand, and the United Kingdom. South Africa produced its own version of the Korea Medal.

Design
Designed by Edward Carter Preston, the Korea Medal is in the form of a  diameter disc. All medals were of cupro-nickel, except for the Canadian version that was made of silver.

On the obverse is an effigy of Queen Elizabeth II, surrounded by an inscription, symbolizing her roles as both fount of honour and Commander-in-Chief of her various forces. At the time of the medal's creation, King George VI was monarch and his effigy was to have appeared on the Korea Medal. However, he died on 6 February 1952 and so the image of his daughter was placed on the obverse of the medal, uncrowned, as per custom for sovereigns prior to their coronation.There are three versions of the inscription surrounding the Queen's head:
 ELIZABETH II DEI GRA. BRITT. OMN. REGINA F.D. (Latin abbreviation for: Elizabeth II, by the Grace of God Queen of all the Britons, Defender of the Faith).
 ELIZABETH II DEI GRATIA REGINA F.D. (Elizabeth II, by the Grace of God Queen, Defender of the Faith), later awards omitting BRITT. OMN..
 ELIZABETH II DEI GRATIA REGINA CANADA (Elizabeth II, by the Grace of God Queen of Canada), awarded to Canadian participants.

On the reverse is a depiction of Hercules wrestling the Hydra—a symbolic representation of communism—with the word KOREA below.

The recipient's name, rank and regimental number was impressed on the medal's rim.

No bars were awarded. A single bronze oak leaf emblem was issued to signify a Mention in Despatches, which was worn pinned to the same ribbon from which the medal was hung.

Eligibility and allocation
Members of the British and Commonwealth armed forces were granted the Korea Medal for active service in the theatre of the Korean Peninsula between 2 July 1950 and 27 July 1953. To receive the medal, navy personnel were required to complete either 28 days aboard ship in the operational areas of the Yellow Sea or the Sea of Japan, or at least one day of shore duty; air force personnel needed to complete one operational sortie over the peninsula or the surrounding seas, or meet the same requirements as naval or army personnel; and army personnel must have undertaken a minimum of one day's service on the strength of a unit serving in Korea. Any military members who had made an official visit to the region for a period of no less than 30 days were also eligible for the medal, as were those who had not fulfilled the requirements due to injury or death in combat. In some countries, civilians in the Red Cross, Order of St. John Voluntary Aid Detachment, Salvation Army, or YMCA could receive the Korea Medal, per navy requirements if they served aboard a hospital ship, or per army requirements if they were stationed on land.

Some 15,000 Korea Medals were issued to Canadian personnel, amongst which 33 members of the Royal Canadian Navy and 248 individuals in the Canadian Army were granted oak leaves to pin to their Korea Medal ribbons.

All persons awarded the Korea Medal also automatically received the United Nations Service Medal for Korea. The South Korean government offered to all UN militia the Korean War Service Medal, though regulations at the time did not permit persons from the Commonwealth to accept the decoration; in 2001, Queen Elizabeth II, as Queen of New Zealand, approved the issuance of the Korean War Services Medal to all New Zealanders who had previously received the Korea Medal.

Precedence
Some orders of precedence are as follows:

See also
 Korea Medal (South Africa)
 Australian campaign medals
 British campaign medals
 New Zealand campaign medals
 Canadian order of precedence (decorations and medals)

References

British campaign medals
Australian campaign medals
Canadian campaign medals
New Zealand campaign medals
Military awards and decorations of the Korean War
Awards established in 1951
Commonwealth of Nations awards
Military history of the United Kingdom during the Korean War